Savchenkoiana is a genus of hairy-eyed craneflies (family Pediciidae) from the Russian far east (Primorskiy kray).

Species
Savchenkoiana mokrzhitskae (Savchenko, 1977)

References

 

Pediciidae
Tipuloidea genera